In music, Op. 35 stands for Opus number 35. Compositions that are assigned this number include:

 Arensky – Variations on a Theme by Tchaikovsky
 Barber – A Hand of Bridge
 Beethoven – Eroica Variations
 Brahms – Variations on a Theme of Paganini
 Chausson – String Quartet
 Chopin – Piano Sonata No. 2
 Fauré – Madrigal
 Hába – Mother
 Korngold – Violin Concerto
 Madetoja – Symphony No. 2
 Paganini – Variations on a Theme of Paganini
 Rachmaninoff – The Bells
 Reger – Sechs Lieder, Op. 35
 Rieding- Concerto in B minor for Violin and Piano Op. 35
 Rimsky-Korsakov – Scheherazade
 Rubinstein – Piano Concerto No. 2
 Schumann – 12 Gedichte
 Shostakovich – Piano Concerto No. 1
 Strauss – Don Quixote
 Szymanowski – Violin Concerto No. 1
Tchaikovsky – Violin Concerto